The 1791 Vermont gubernatorial election for Governor of Vermont, the first since Vermont joined the Union as the 14th state, took place throughout September, and resulted in the re-election of Governor Thomas Chittenden to a one-year term.

The Vermont General Assembly met in Windsor on October 13. The Vermont House of Representatives appointed a committee to examine the votes of the freemen of Vermont for governor, lieutenant governor, treasurer, and members of the governor's council. Vermont was admitted into the United States on March 4, 1791, and this was the first election for state offices since Vermont had become the 14th state.

In the race for governor, Thomas Chittenden, who had been governor from 1778 to 1789, and again starting in 1790, was re-elected for a one-year term. In the election for lieutenant governor, Peter Olcott was re-elected to a second one-year term. The freemen also re-elected Samuel Mattocks as treasurer, his fifth one-year term. The names of candidates and balloting totals for statewide offices were not recorded.

Results

References

Vermont gubernatorial elections
Gubernatorial
1791 elections in North America
Vermont